Francisco Bauzá (1849–1899) was a Uruguayan political figure and historian.

Background
He was the son of Uruguayan independence fighter Rufino Bauzá. 
He was married with María Schiaffino.
He was associated with the Uruguayan Colorado Party.

Public offices
He served as a Deputy, Senator, and Government Minister. He also served as Uruguayan minister to Brazil.

A noted Roman Catholic in a party which was increasingly secularist, Bauzá opposed the Varela educational reforms which his own party backed. Furthermore, since the position of Catholic, he questioned the lay concept the same. In this spirit, prompted the Catholic Society Free Education; it was founded in 1882, and was presided over by Bishop Inocencio María Yéregui.

Toward the end of his life he accepted an appointment to President Juan Lindolfo Cuestas's Council of State.

Historian
Bauzá was also a noted historian. His particular interest was pre-independence Uruguay, but seen from the perspective of a post-independence Uruguayan national.

Death
He died in 1899.

Bibliography

 Theoretical and practical studies on the institution of the National Bank (1874)
 Essays on the formation of a middle class (1876)
 History of Spanish rule in Uruguay (1880 - 1882)
 Literary Studies (1885)
 Constitutional Studies (1887)
 Poets of the revolution

See also
 History of Uruguay
 Politics of Uruguay
 List of political families#Uruguay

References
Biography of Francisco Bauzá

External links
 https://web.archive.org/web/20071011040153/http://www.mec.gub.uy/academiadeletras/DANNOMBRE/Bauza_Fco.htm

1849 births
1899 deaths
Colorado Party (Uruguay) politicians
Members of the Chamber of Representatives of Uruguay
Members of the Senate of Uruguay
Interior ministers of Uruguay
Uruguayan Roman Catholics
Burials at Montevideo Metropolitan Cathedral